The Boulevard de la Bastille is the southwesternmost street of the 12th arrondissement of Paris, situated in the quartier called Quinze-Vingts. It overlooks the east side of the Paris marina, known as the Port de Plaisance or  Port de l'Arsenal, with which it forms a boundary with the 4th arrondissement of Paris. (The Port de l'Arsenal is in fact the terminus of the Canal Saint-Martin, which begins at the Place de Stalingrad.) The boulevard also lies directly north (across the Seine) of the border between the 5th arrondissement and the 13th arrondissement of Paris.

Description

It ends at the Place de la Bastille, home of the Opéra Bastille.

The boulevard was given its current name of Boulevard de la Bastille in 1898, due to its contiguity to the Place de la Bastille. Formerly it was known as the Rue de la Contrescarpe.

Métro Stations

The boulevard is home to 26 apartment buildings and is bounded by two Métro stations: at its beginning by the Quai de la Rapée station serving line  , and at its end by the Bastille station, serving lines    .

Notable Sites

The boulevard overlooks the part of the Canal Saint-Martin known as the Port de l'Arsenal (or Paris marina). A garden stretches along the area between the boulevard and the canal, which also contains a small children's playground, a restaurant ("Le Grand Bleu") and a pitch for the game of boules. 
At number 10, the contemporary museum La Maison Rouge (Fondation Antoine-de-Galbert). [Closed on 28 October 2018]
At number 52, the building known as Immeuble de l'îlot Biscornet.

See also
Bassin de l'Arsenal
Bastille

External links
La Maison Rouge

Geography of Paris
Saint-Martin
12th arrondissement of Paris